The High School of Glasgow is a private, co-educational day school in Glasgow, Scotland. The original High School of Glasgow was founded as the choir school of Glasgow Cathedral in around 1124, and is the oldest school in Scotland, and the twelfth oldest in the United Kingdom. On its closure as a selective grammar school by Glasgow City Corporation in 1976, it immediately continued as a co-educational independent school as a result of fundraising activity by its Former Pupil Club and via a merge by the Club with Drewsteignton School. The school maintains a relationship with the Cathedral, where it holds an annual service of commemoration and thanksgiving in September. It counts two British Prime Ministers, two Lords President and the founder of the University of Aberdeen among its alumni.

It is a selective school, meaning prospective pupils must sit an entrance test to gain admission. In 2009 and 2017, The Times placed it as the top independent school in Scotland for SQA results.

The rector of the school is John O'Neill.

History

The original school was founded as the Choir School of Glasgow Cathedral in around 1124, and later became known as Glasgow Grammar School. It was housed in Greyfriar's Wynd until 1782, when it moved to new purpose-built accommodation in George Street, but it moved again in 1821 to new premises between John Street and Montrose Street. The name was changed in 1834 to The High School of Glasgow, and in 1872 it was transferred to the management of the Glasgow School Board. In 1878, the school moved into the former premises of the Glasgow Academy on Elmbank Street, when the latter moved to its new home in Kelvinbridge in the West End of the city. The Glasgow High School for Girls was founded in 1894 and housed variously in Garnethill and Kelvindale.

In 1976, the regional council closed the Boys' High School, while the Girls' High School began admitting boys and was renamed as Cleveden Secondary School. The proposed closure was met with anger from former pupils and, the day after the closure of the Boys' High School, the new, independent, co-educational high school was created, following a merger involving the former pupils' association, the Glasgow High School Club, and Drewsteignton School in Bearsden, which effectively became the new high school. The new school moved to a site on Crow Road which had been a playing field owned by the Glasgow High School Club. In 1983 an arts and science extension was opened. The former boys' school buildings on Elmbank Street were converted to become part of Strathclyde House, headquarters of Strathclyde Regional Council, with the old school dining room becoming the council chamber.

Today

The new, purpose-built senior school (Transitus to S6) is in  Old Anniesland, owned by the Glasgow High School Club (below). There have been multiple extensions to these buildings, including the two-storey science block. The junior school (kindergarten to P6) occupies the site of the former Drewsteignton School, on Ledcameroch Road in Old Bearsden. The headmistress of the junior school is Heather Fuller.

Houses
Pupils at the school are divided into the following Houses:
Bannerman, for Sir Henry Campbell-Bannerman. (Red)
Clyde, for Lord Clyde. (Blue)
Law, for Bonar Law. (Green)
Moore, for Sir John Moore. (Yellow)

The school operates a house competition, and pupils may earn points for their house through excellence in areas such as sports, music, academia. The current holder of the overall house championship is Bannerman House. The Junior School Houses take their names from British lifeboat stations: Broughtyferry (red), Campbelltown (blue), Lizard (green) and Longhope (yellow).

Glasgow High School Club

The Glasgow High School Club is the former pupil club of the high school and its predecessor schools, the High School for Boys, the Girls' High School and Drewsteignton School.

The club is a limited company, run by a committee and a president, who is elected annually. The president is Craig Macdonald, and the past president is Ronnie Gourley. The honorary president is The Lord Macfarlane of Bearsden, and the Rector of the School, John O'Neill, is an ex officio member. The rest of the committee comprises three honorary vice presidents, senior vice president, junior vice president, secretary, treasurer, house convenor, seven ordinary members, GHK Rugby president, triathlon representative, president of the ladies' section and president of ladies' hockey.

The club owns Old Anniesland, the site on which the school now stands, and is based in the pavilion. The club runs all the facilities at Old Anniesland, including the Jimmie Ireland Stand but excluding the school. Use of the club's facilities is restricted to members. The club runs a number of sports teams, although the former Glasgow High Kelvinside (GHK) rugby club merged in 1997 with rivals Glasgow Academicals FC to form Glasgow Hawks. The name was intended as an acronym of High, Accies, West (of Scotland) and Kelvinside, however West of Scotland declined the invitation to merge into the new team and continue to play separately from their ground in Milngavie. The friendly rivalry with the Glasgow Accies, based at neighbouring New Anniesland, inspired the name of the Anniesland Trophy, an annual golf competition between the clubs.

The club also has an active London branch, The London Club, which hosts a dinner every March at the Caledonian Club and a lunch in early October for recent leavers moving to study in London. The London Club also runs a number of sports teams, particularly golf.

Notable alumni

Notable former pupils of the high school have included two prime ministers, the founder of the University of Aberdeen, the current and most recent principals of the University of Glasgow and numerous judges and law officers, including the current Lord President of the Court of Session, as well as politicians, businessmen and academics.

Academia
 Ross Anderson, professor of security engineering, University of Cambridge
 Duncan Inglis Cameron, secretary of Heriot-Watt University
 Sir Ian Heilbron, professor of organic chemistry at Imperial College London
 Sir Joseph Dalton Hooker, botanist, president of the Royal Society
 John Horne, geologist
 Professor Sheila McLean, director, Institute of Law and Ethics in Medicine, University of Glasgow School of Law
 Sir Mungo William MacCallum, vice-chancellor of the University of Sydney
 Prof Sir Anton Muscatelli, economist, Principal of the University of Glasgow
 Sir Muir Russell, Principal of the University of Glasgow
 Professor Sir Thomas Smith, general editor, The Laws of Scotland: Stair Memorial Encyclopædia
 Bernard Wasserstein, historian

Arts
 Douglas G. Boyd, orchestral conductor
 Thomas Campbell, poet
 Norman Fulton, composer
 Graeme Kelling, guitarist with Deacon Blue
 Edwin Morgan OBE, poet, The Scots Makar
 Eric Woolfson, songwriter and musician

Business
 John Bannerman, Baron Bannerman of Kildonan, farmer and Liberal Politician
 William Beardmore, 1st Baron Invernairn, industrialist
 John Elder, shipbuilder
 Norman Macfarlane, Baron Macfarlane of Bearsden KT, industrialist and life peer
 James Mavor, economist
 William Smart, economist

Law
 Hazel Cosgrove, Lady Cosgrove, first female senator of the College of Justice (retired)
 Charles Dickson, Lord Dickson, Lord Justice Clerk and Lord Advocate
 George Emslie, Baron Emslie, Lord President of the Court of Session
 David Fleming, Lord Fleming, senator of the College of Justice and Solicitor General
 Arthur Campbell Hamilton, Lord Hamilton, Lord President of the Court of Session
 Harald Leslie, Lord Birsay, chairman of the Scottish Land Court
 Alexander Philip, Lord Philip, senator of the College of Justice
 Harold Sheppard, solicitor and public notary in Singapore
 Henry Wilson, Baron Wilson of Langside, Lord Advocate
 Roddy Dunlop, Dean of the Faculty of Advocates from 2020

Media
 Muriel Gray, journalist and broadcaster
 Fyfe Robertson, Scottish television journalist
 Katharine Whitehorn, journalist and feminist
 Susan Calman, comedian and panellist

Military
 Field Marshal Colin Campbell, 1st Baron Clyde, senior British Army officer
 Lieutenant-General Sir John Moore, senior British Army officer
 Surgeon Vice Admiral Alasdair Walker, senior Royal Navy officer and Surgeon-General

Politics
 Sir Henry Campbell-Bannerman, prime minister
 Bonar Law, prime minister
 James Bryce, British Ambassador to the United States
 John Annan Bryce, Liberal MP
 Sir Henry Craik, 1st Baronet, MP for Glasgow and Aberdeen Universities
 Barry Gardiner, Labour MP
 James Gray, Conservative MP
 Iain MacCormick, Scottish National Party MP
 Professor Sir Neil MacCormick, jurist and SNP MEP
 Anna McCurley, Conservative MP
 John Macdonald, Liberal MP
 Sir Walter Menzies, Liberal MP
 Anne Pringle, ambassador to Russia
 Steve Rodan, Speaker of the House of Keys
 Sir Teddy Taylor, Conservative MP
 Charles Gray, HM Ambassador to the Kingdom of Morocco and latterly Marshall of the Diplomatic Corps

Religion
 William Elphinstone, Bishop of Aberdeen and founder of the University of Aberdeen
 Robert Reid Kalley, physician and missionary to Portuguese-speaking territories
 David Lacy, Moderator of the General Assembly of the Church of Scotland, 2005
 David Lunan, Moderator of the General Assembly of the Church of Scotland, 2008
 R Guy Ramsay, Baptist minister and president of the Baptist Union of Scotland, 1948–49
 Very Revd Dr John R Gray, minister of Dunblane Cathedral and Moderator of the General Assembly

Science
 Halliday Sutherland, physician and author
 Professor Fergus Campbell FRS, Professor of Physiology

Sport
 John Christie, cricketer
 Walter Coulter, amateur footballer
 Frank Deighton, golfer
Alison Sheppard, Olympic and Commonwealth swimmer
 Harold Sheppard, cricketer
 Charlie Telfer, footballer

In addition, 29 one-time pupils of the High School have represented Scotland at international level in rugby union. They include John Bannerman, Angus Cameron, Donald Cameron, Jimmy Docherty, John Dykes, George Frew, Jimmy Ireland, Hamish Kemp, Ian Shaw and Robert Wilson Shaw.

Other
 Temple Moore, architect
 Ian McDonald, civil servant, spokesman for the Ministry of Defence during the Falklands War

Notable staff
Donald MacCormick – journalist
Thomas Muir, mathematician
Peter Pinkerton FRSE – rector from 1914 to 1930

Notes

External links
 High School of Glasgow Website
 The High School of Glasgow's page on Scottish Schools Online

1124 establishments in Scotland
Educational institutions established in the 12th century
Member schools of the Headmasters' and Headmistresses' Conference
Private schools in Glasgow